Kinu (also Romanized as Kīnū) is a village in Angut-e Gharbi Rural District, Anguti District, Germi County, Ardabil Province, Iran. At the 2006 census, its population was 129, in 24 families.

References 

Towns and villages in Germi County